Richard Markes (1671–1704) was a M.P. for Petersfield.

He was born in Portsmouth, the only son of Richard and Anne Markes. In 1693 he married Mary Randall of Petersfield: they had 3 sons and  2 daughters. He was Clerk of the Rope Yard in Portsmouth Dockyard from 1691; and a Freeman of Portsmouth from 1702.

References

Politicians from Portsmouth
English MPs 1701–1702
English MPs 1702–1705
1670 births
1738 deaths
People from Petersfield